Proceedings of the National Academy of Sciences of the United States of America (often abbreviated PNAS or PNAS USA) is a peer-reviewed multidisciplinary scientific journal. It is the official journal of the National Academy of Sciences, published since 1915, and publishes original research, scientific reviews, commentaries, and letters. According to Journal Citation Reports, the journal has a 2021 impact factor of 12.779. PNAS is the second most cited scientific journal, with more than 1.9 million cumulative citations from 2008 to 2018. In the mass media, PNAS has been described variously as "prestigious", "sedate", "renowned" and "high impact".

PNAS is a delayed open access journal, with an embargo period of six months that can be bypassed for an author fee (hybrid open access). Since September 2017, open access articles are published under a Creative Commons license. Since January 2019, PNAS has been online-only, although print issues are available on demand.

History 
PNAS was established by the National Academy of Sciences (NAS) in 1914, with its first issue published in 1915. The NAS itself was founded in 1863 as a private institution, but chartered by the United States Congress, with the goal to "investigate, examine, experiment and report upon any subject of science or art."

Prior to the inception of PNAS, the National Academy of Sciences published three volumes of organizational transactions, consisting mostly of minutes of meetings and annual reports. For much of the journal's history, PNAS published brief first announcements of Academy members' and associates' contributions to research. In December 1995, PNAS opened submissions to all authors without first needing to be sponsored by an NAS member.

Members were allowed to communicate up to two papers from non-members to PNAS every year. The review process for these papers was anonymous in that the identities of the referees were not revealed to the authors. Referees were selected by the NAS member.  PNAS eliminated communicated submissions through NAS members , while continuing to make the final decision on all PNAS papers.

95% of papers are peer reviewed Direct Submissions and 5% are contributed submissions.

In 2022 NAS established PNAS Nexus, an interdisciplinary open-access journal published by Oxford Academic.

American national security concerns
In 2003, PNAS issued an editorial stating its policy on publication of sensitive material in the life sciences. PNAS stated that it would "continue to monitor submitted papers for material that may be deemed inappropriate and that could, if published, compromise the public welfare." This statement was in keeping with the efforts of several other journals.  In 2005 PNAS published an article titled "Analyzing a bioterror attack on the food supply: The case of botulinum toxin in milk", despite objections raised by the U.S. Department of Health and Human Services. The paper was published with a commentary by the president of the Academy at the time, Bruce Alberts, titled "Modeling attacks on the food supply".

Editors
The following people have been editors-in-chief of the journal:

The first managing editor of the journal was mathematician Edwin Bidwell Wilson.

Notes

References

External links

 

Weekly journals
Delayed open access journals
Hybrid open access journals
English-language journals
Publications established in 1915
Multidisciplinary scientific journals
United States National Academy of Sciences
Academic journals published by learned and professional societies of the United States